This is the complete list of Asian Games medalists in pencak silat on 2018.

Men

Seni

Tunggal

Ganda

Regu

Tanding

55 kg

60 kg

65 kg

70 kg

75 kg

90 kg

95 kg

Women

Seni

Tunggal

Ganda

Regu

Tanding

55 kg

60 kg

65 kg

References

External links 
Pencak Silat Results Book

Martial arts

medalists